Putinovo, formerly known as Adžinci, is a rural mountain village in Serbia's Medveđa municipality. Putinovo renamed itself the latter in 2017, in honor of Russian president Vladimir Putin. There is avid support for both Putin and former U.S. president Donald Trump in the village.

See also
 Gornji Gajtan

References

Populated places in Jablanica District
Vladimir Putin